The 1901 All-Ireland Senior Football Championship Final was the fourteenth All-Ireland Final and the deciding match of the 1901 All-Ireland Senior Football Championship, an inter-county Gaelic football tournament for the top teams in Ireland.

Dublin won the final easily, and were received by the Lord Mayor in the Mansion House after the game.

It was the first of five All-Ireland football titles won by Dublin in the 1900s.

References

Gaelic football
All-Ireland Senior Football Championship Finals
Dublin county football team matches
London county football team matches